Larissa Yasmin Behrendt   (born 1969) is an Australian legal academic, writer, filmmaker and Indigenous rights advocate.  she is a professor of law and director of research and academic programs at the Jumbunna Institute for Indigenous Education and Research at the University of Technology Sydney, and holds the inaugural Chair in Indigenous Research at UTS.

Early life and education
Behrendt was born in Cooma, New South Wales, in 1969, of Eualeyai/Kamillaroi descent on her father's side. Her mother, who was non-Indigenous, worked in naval intelligence, while her father was an air traffic controller and later an Aboriginal Studies academic. He established the Aboriginal Research and Resource Centre at the University of New South Wales, Sydney in 1988, around the time when Behrendt commenced studying there.

After attending Kirrawee High School, Behrendt completed a Bachelor of Jurisprudence and Bachelor of Laws degree at the University of New South Wales in 1992. In the same year, she was admitted by the Supreme Court of New South Wales to practise as a solicitor. After a stint of working in family law and legal aid, she travelled on a scholarship to the United States, where she completed a Master of Laws at Harvard Law School in 1994, and a Doctor of Juridical Science from the same institution in 1998. Behrendt was the first indigenous Australian to graduate from Harvard Law School.

She also earned a Graduate Diploma in Screenwriting (2012) and Graduate Diploma in Documentary (2013) at the Australian Film, Television and Radio School (AFTRS), and is a graduate of the Australian Institute of Company Directors (2013).

Career

Legal and academic
After graduating from Harvard Law School in the mid-1990s, Behrendt worked in Canada for a year with a range of First Nations organisations. In 1999, she worked with the Assembly of First Nations in developing a gender equality policy, and she represented the Assembly at the United Nations. The same year, she did a study for the Slavey people comparing native title developments in Australia, Canada and New Zealand.

Behrendt returned to Australia to become a postdoctoral researcher at the Australian National University, moving to University of Technology, Sydney (UTS) in 2000. In 2000, she was admitted by the Supreme Court of the Australian Capital Territory to practise as a barrister. Behrendt is a republican, opposing the institution of monarchy in Australia.

Behrendt has been involved in several pro bono test cases involving adverse treatment of Aboriginal peoples in the criminal justice system, including appearing as junior counsel in the NSW Supreme Court case of Campbell v Director of Public Prosecutions [2008]. She worked inside the NSW prison system between 2003 and 2012 in her role as Alternative Chair of the Serious Offenders Review Council. She has also held judicial positions on the Administrative Decisions Tribunal (Equal Opportunity Division) and as a Land Commissioner on the Land and Environment Court.

Current positions
 she is a professor of law and director of research and academic programs at the Jumbunna Institute for Indigenous Education and Research at the University of Technology Sydney, and holds the inaugural Chair in Indigenous Research, a leadership position that advises the Deputy Vice-Chancellor (Research) on Indigenous strategy. She is also a fellow of the Academy of the Social Sciences in Australia and a Foundation Fellow of the Australian Academy of Law.

Other work

In education and community
Behrendt has been active in issues around Indigenous education including literacy. In 2002, she was the co-recipient of the inaugural Neville Bonner National Teaching Award. She has served on the board of Tranby Aboriginal College in Glebe, Sydney and has been ambassador for the Gawura Campus (an Indigenous primary school) of St Andrew's Cathedral School since at least 2012. She was a founder of the Sydney Story Factory in 2012, which established a literacy program in Redfern.

In April 2011, Behrendt was appointed to chair the Review of Higher Education Access and Outcomes for Aboriginal and Torres Strait Islander People for the federal government. The Review, tasked with providing a roadmap for Indigenous university education, delivered its report in September 2012 and received a widely positive response for its emphasis on achievable parity targets and the re-allocation of existing resources to support meaningful outcomes such as "fostering a 'professional class' of Indigenous graduates". In releasing the report on 14 September 2012, Senator Chris Evans, Minister for Tertiary Education, accepted all of its recommendations.

From 2009 to 2012, she co-chaired the City of Sydney's Aboriginal and Torres Strait Islander Advisory Panel.

In the arts
Behrendt has played an active role in creating and supporting arts organisations and initiatives and is a consistent advocate of increased funding for the arts. She was the inaugural chair of National Indigenous Television (NITV), the first broadcast television network in Australia dedicated to Indigenous programming, from 2006 to 2009.

In 2008, she was appointed to the board of the Bangarra Dance Theatre and was chair from 2010 20 2014. She was appointed to the board of Museums and Galleries NSW in 2012, a role which continues .

Behrendt has served on the board of the Sydney Writers' Festival since 2015, the board of the Museum of Contemporary Art Australia, chairing their Indigenous Advisory Panel (2007–2012).

She was a board member of the Australian Major Performing Arts Group (AMPAG) from 2013 to 2014, was a judge of non-fiction on the New South Wales Premier's Literary Awards (2013–2014) and has been a member of the Australia Council Major Performing Arts Panel since 2015.

Writing
Behrendt has written extensively on legal and Indigenous social justice issues. Her books include Aboriginal Dispute Resolution (1995) and Achieving Social Justice (2003). In 2005 she co-authored the book Treaty.

Behrendt has also written three works of fiction, including a novel, Home, which won the Queensland Premier's Literary Awards, the David Unaipon Award in 2002, and the Commonwealth Writers Prize for Best First Novel in the south-east Asian/South Pacific region in 2005. Her second novel, Legacy, won the Victorian Premier's Literary Award for Prize for Indigenous Writing (2010). Her third novel, After Story, was published in 2021.

In 2012, Behrendt published Indigenous Australia For Dummies.

Film
Behrendt has written, directed, and/or produced a number of documentary films since 2013, including Innocence Betrayed (2013, writer) In My Blood It Runs (2019, producer) and Maralinga Tjarutja (2020, writer), the latter about the British nuclear tests at Maralinga in South Australia. She was Indigenous consultant for the TV documentary miniseries Australia: The Story of Us in 2015, Who do you think you are? (2018–2019) and other projects.

In 2016 Behrendt (as director) Michaela Perske (producer) and were awarded the Indigenous Feature Documentary Initiative funding by the Adelaide Film Festival in conjunction with Screen Australia and KOJO to work on their feature documentary project, After the Apology, and on 9 October 2017, AFF held the world première of the resulting film. The film looks at the increase in Indigenous child removal in the years following Kevin Rudd's Apology to Australia's Indigenous peoples. It won Best Direction of a Documentary Feature Film from the Australian Directors Guild in 2018, and was nominated in three categories in the 2018 AACTA Awards, including Best Direction in Nonfiction Television.

Behrendt directed Maralinga Tjarutja, a May 2020 television documentary made by Blackfella Films for ABC Television, which tells the story of the people of Maralinga, South Australia, since the 1950s British nuclear tests at Maralinga. It was deliberately broadcast around the same time that the drama series Operation Buffalo was on, to give voice to the Indigenous people of the area and show how it disrupted their lives. Screenhub gave it 4.5 stars, calling it an "excellent documentary". The film shows the resilience of the Maralinga Tjarutja people, and how they have continued to fight for their rights to look after the contaminated land.

In 2020 Behrendt worked as a writer for Season 2 of Total Control (TV series), and as writer/director on a documentary film entitled The Fight Together.

In 2021 Behrendt released the documentary Araatika: Rise Up!.

Radio
Behrendt presents radio programme Speaking Out, covering "politics, arts and culture from a range of Indigenous perspectives".  it broadcasts on ABC Radio National on Fridays at 12pm (noon) and on ABC Local Radio on Sundays at 9pm.

Recognition
In 1993, Behrendt was the winner of the Lionel Murphy Foundation Scholarship.
In 2002, she was the co-recipient of the inaugural Neville Bonner National Teaching Award.
2002 David Unaipon Award in the Queensland Premier's Literary Awards for her fiction work Home.
In 2004 she won the award for outstanding achievement in literature in the 2004 Deadlys.
2005 Commonwealth Writers' Prize – Best first novel (Asia/Pacific).
In 2009, Behrendt was named National NAIDOC Person of the Year.
2009 Victorian Premier's Literary Award, Prize for Indigenous Writing for Legacy.
In 2011, she was named the NSW Australian of the Year.
2012 AFTRS's AW Myer Indigenous Award.
2018 Australian Directors Guild award for Best Direction of a Documentary Feature Film for After the Apology. 
In the 2020 Australia Day Honours, Behrendt was made an Officer in the General Division of the Order of Australia (AO), for her "distinguished service to Indigenous education and research, the law and the visual and performing arts".
In the 2021 Human Rights Awards (Australia), she won the Human Rights medal.

Personal life
Behrendt married US artist Kris Faller in 1997 while at Harvard. They separated amicably in 2001 and were later divorced.

She had a long-term relationship with Geoff Scott, a senior Indigenous bureaucrat, former CEO of the Aboriginal and Torres Strait Islander Commission, and current CEO of NSW Aboriginal Land Council.

In 2009, Behrendt began a relationship with Michael Lavarch, former Attorney-General of Australia; they married in 2011.

Bibliography

Novels
 
 Legacy, University of Queensland Press, St Lucia, QLD, 2009, 
After Story, University of Queensland Press, St Lucia, QLD, 2021,

Short Stories
 The Space Between Us, in Behrendt et al., 10 short stories you must read in 2011, the Australia Council for the Arts, Australia, 2011, Chapter 3: pp. 47–67

Children's fiction
 Crossroads, Oxford University Press, South Melbourne, VIC, 2011,

Non-fiction
 Aboriginal Dispute Resolution: A step towards self-determination and community autonomy, Federation Press, Leichhardt, NSW 1995, 
 Achieving social justice: indigenous rights and Australia's future, Federation Press, Annandale, NSW, 2003, 
 Resolving Indigenous Disputes: Land conflict and beyond, co-authored with Loretta Kelly, Federation Press, Leichhardt, NSW, 2008, 
 
 Indigenous Australia for Dummies, John Wiley & Sons, Milton, QLD, 2012, 
 Rabbit-proof Fence, Currency Press, Sydney, NSW, 2012, 
 Finding Eliza: Power and colonial storytelling, University of Queensland Press, St Lucia, QLD, 2016,

2011 tweet storm and Eatock v Bolt 
Comments made by Behrendt on Twitter that appeared to disparage Northern Territory Member of the Legislative Assembly, Territory Minister, and Aboriginal elder Bess Price caused controversy despite Behrendt's continued insistence that the tweet was taken out of context. She maintains that she was referring not to Price, but to the acrimonious tenor of a debate on the television program Q+A. Behrendt had replied to a Twitter comment that had expressed outrage about Price's support for the Northern Territory intervention, writing "I watched a show where a guy had sex with a horse and I'm sure it was less offensive than Bess Price", referring to TV series Deadwood. Behrendt apologised both publicly and privately to Price, who did not formally accept her apology. Behrendt said that the throwaway comment has made her a target for a campaign of character assassination, with several commentators agreeing, most notably Robert Manne. The Australian published 15 stories on Behrendt within two weeks of the tweet.

The disparagement of Behrendt was subsequently characterised as a coordinated response to a court case in which she and eight others were simultaneously involved against News Corp, known as Eatock v Bolt. Herald Sun columnist Andrew Bolt had used Behrendt's name in two articles about "political" Aboriginal people. Bolt asserted that Behrendt and other fair-skinned Aboriginal people claimed Aboriginality to advance their careers. The Federal Court ruled that the articles were inflammatory, offensive and contravened the Racial Discrimination Act.

Notes

References

External links

After the Apology
 15-minute video, presented by Stan Grant in the program Matter of Fact with Stan Grant, which includes Behrendt and one of the grandmothers who features in the film.
 (Online rental of complete film)

1969 births
20th-century Australian novelists
Living people
Australian non-fiction writers
Australian women novelists
Australian republicans
Harvard Law School alumni
Indigenous Australian writers
University of New South Wales Law School alumni
20th-century Australian women writers
Academic staff of the University of Technology Sydney
Australian feminist writers
Fellows of the Australian Academy of Law
Fellows of the Academy of the Social Sciences in Australia
Indigenous Australian academics
Indigenous Australian women academics
Officers of the Order of Australia
Australian women academics
Australian feminists